Natukhay is a rural locality (an aul) in Takhtamukayskoye Rural Settlement of Takhtamukaysky District, the Republic of Adygea, Russia. The population was 330 as of 2018. There are 10 streets.

Geography 
Natukhay is located 10 km south of Takhtamukay (the district's administrative centre) by road. Otradny is the nearest rural locality.

Ethnicity 
The aul is inhabited by Natukhajs.

References 

Rural localities in Takhtamukaysky District